MR1 or MR-1 may refer to:
 Bristol M.R.1, an experimental biplane
 HAWAII MR1, a sea floor imaging system
 Major histocompatibility complex, class I-related
 Mercury-Redstone 1, an unsuccessful unmanned American space mission
 PNKD, or myofibrillogenesis regulator 1
 Shewanella oneidensis MR-1, a bacterium
 Spyder MR1, a paintball marker
 Hadoop architecture Map/Reduce version 1